Vedvistara asama charitable trust is an NGO in Kerala, India. It is a non profit organization working in the realm of mental health, especially that of children. They conduct free awareness programs for parents and teachers and medical camps for children with learning disability, Autism etc.

They also do free awareness programs in topics like bipolar disorder, schizophrenia and other mental disorders.

They recently conducted a medical camp in Nalanda Auditorium, Calicut for children with Attention deficit hyperactivity disorder (ADHD) which was inaugurated by the education minister of kerala, Sri. P.K. Abdurabb

Vedvistara has developed a new software called KILIPPATTU to intervene with the issues of learning disability.

Vedvistara runs a school for children with learning disability and/or ADHD. The admission is restricted to those children who have a good IQ but are poor in scholastic performance

References

 Official website-Vedvistara
 Philosophy-philosophy
 News-The Hindu
 News-

Mental health organisations in India
Organisations based in Kozhikode
Organizations with year of establishment missing